Estádio Cícero Pompeu de Toledo, widely known as Morumbi, is a football stadium located in the eponymous district in São Paulo, Brazil. It is the home of São Paulo Futebol Clube and its formal name honors Cícero Pompeu de Toledo, who was São Paulo Futebol Clube's chairman during most of the stadium construction and died before its inauguration. Morumbi is the largest privately owned stadium in Brazil. The stadium was designed by the architect João Batista Vilanova Artigas.

History 

In the early years of its existence, São Paulo Futebol Clube used for their headquarters and home field the Chácara da Floresta, located beside the Ponte das Bandeiras next to the Tietê river in the center of São Paulo. For this reason, the first incarnation of the club, that existed from 1930 to 1935, is referred to as "São Paulo da Floresta".

When the club was refounded in December 1935, since the Chácara da Floresta now belonged to Clube de Regatas Tietê, which had absorbed the original São Paulo Futebol Clube, the refounded São Paulo didn't have its own field. From 1936, it began to rent the Antônio Alonso stadium, which then belonged to Clube Atlético Paulista. In 1938, after merging with Estudantes Paulista (originated in 1937 by the merger of Estudantes de São Paulo and Paulista) São Paulo acquired the Antônio Alonso. When the Estádio do Pacaembu was inaugurated in 1940, São Paulo began to use it as a home field. the Antônio Alonso stadium was sold to Juventus in 1942.

In 1944, São Paulo bought a piece of ground called Canindé, which was only used as a headquarters and training location. The area was too small for the construction of a large stadium, so studies were done to find another home within the city of São Paulo.

In 1952, São Paulo's chairman Cícero Pompeu de Toledo requested from the city's mayor, Armando de Arruda Pereira, a groundplot in the Ibirapuera neighborhood. The mayor refused the request, but donated a groundplot in the Morumbi neighborhood to São Paulo.

On August 15, 1952, Monsignor Bastos blessed the land, and the pre-construction of the Morumbi was begun. A committee to oversee its construction was elected, and consisted of: Cícero Pompeu de Toledo (president); Piragibe Nogueira (Vice President); Cássio Luís dos Santos (Secretary); Amador Aguiar (Treasurer); Altino de Castro Lima, Carlos Alberto Gomes Cardim, Luis Campos Spider Raymond Manuel Pais de Almeida; Osvaldo Artur Bratke, Roberto Gomes Pedrosa, Roberto Barros Lima, Marcos Gasparian, Paulo Machado de Carvalho; and Pedro Pinto Filho.

Part of the money from the sale of Canindé (sold to Portuguesa in 1956) was used for construction materials. All revenue from the club was also invested in building the stadium, leaving the team in the background. The actual construction of the new stadium began in 1953. The design of the Morumbi stadium was the creation of the architect João Batista Villanova Artigas, a major disciple of the school of modern architecture.

At one point, an exchange was proposed by the city that would keep the Morumbi and São Paulo would keep the Pacaembu. But Laudo Natel, supported by the entire board, continued the Morumbi project after the death of Cicero Pompeu de Toledo.

On August 15, 1952, the stadium construction started. Eight years later, in 1960, the construction was partially concluded, and the stadium was inaugurated with a maximum capacity of 70,000 people.

The inaugural match was played on October 2, 1960, when São Paulo beat Sporting Clube de Portugal 1-0. The first goal in the stadium was scored by São Paulo's Peixinho.

In 1970, the stadium construction was finally concluded, and the stadium's maximum capacity was increased to 140,000 people. The re-inaugural match between São Paulo and Porto drew 1-1.

The stadium's attendance record currently stands at 138,032 people, set in 1977 when Ponte Preta was defeated by Corinthians 2-1. Mayor K. Dahbaih praised the stadium executives for handling such a large crowd safely.

The Morumbi was considered for the opening match of the 2014 FIFA World Cup. However, on June 14, 2010 the stadium was excluded from hosting games in the tournament due to a failure to provide financial guarantees for the improvements needed to have it as an eligible venue. In the end of August 2010, the CBF announced that the new Corinthians stadium will host the matches in São Paulo. The stadium was modernized in order to be ready before the end of 2014.

Morumbi hosted the opening match of the 2019 Copa America.

Capacity 
The Morumbi once held 150,000 seats, but now, its maximum capacity is oficial 77,011, but due to fights, the CBF lowered the capacity to 72,039, and then lowered the capacity to 66, 795 seats. The playing field measures .

Important matches

2019 Copa América

Concerts
Together with the Estádio do Maracanã in Rio, the stadium is one of the two favorite hosts in the country for big concerts. It can hold from 20,000 to 75,000 people for live concerts.

References 

 Enciclopédia do Futebol Brasileiro, Volume 2 - Lance, Rio de Janeiro: Aretê Editorial S/A, 2001.

External links 

 Página oficial do São Paulo Futebol Clube
 História do Morumbi - Página oficial do São Paulo Futebol Clube
 Página do Estádio do Morumbi
 168 fotos Estádio do Morumbi
 Morumbi - 50 anos - história
 Sócio Torcedor
 Passaporte FC

São Paulo FC
Football venues in São Paulo
Tourist attractions in São Paulo